Chlorophytum holstii is a flowering plant species in the genus Chlorophytum, endemic to Tanzania and Kenya.

Synonyms 
 Chlorophytum hoffmannii Engl.
 Chlorophytum holstii var. glabrum Poelln.
 Chlorophytum pulverulentum Peter ex Poelln.
 Chlorophytum uvinsense Poelln.

References 
 Engl., 1895 In: Pflanzenw. Ost-Afrikas, C: 140
 IUCN Redlist entry
 JSTOR entry
 The Plant List entry

Agavoideae